Marmara salictella is a moth of the family Gracillariidae. It is known from Québec in Canada and Connecticut, Maine, Vermont, Virginia, California and the Atlantic states of the United States.

The larvae feed on Salix species, including Salix lasiolepis and Salix lutea. They create an extremely long and narrow mine in young twigs. The mine is only a tract beneath the young and delicate cuticle of the branches.

Taxonomy
A Marmara species feeding on Citrus species was originally identified as Marmara salictella. Later research concluded this species is distinct. It is now known as Marmara gulosa.

References

Gracillariinae
Moths described in 1863